Demers is a surname, and may refer to:

 Dominique Demers (born 1956), doctor of children's literature, Quebec writer and screenwriter
 Eugene L. Demers (1842–1912), New York politician
 Gaston Demers (1935–2004), Canadian politician
 Isabelle Demers (born 1982), Canadian organist
 Jacques Demers (born 1944), Canadian hockey coach
John Demers, Attorney in the United States
 Jason Demers (born 1988), Canadian ice hockey player
 Jérôme Demers (1774–1853), Canadian educator
 Louis Julien Demers (1848–1905), merchant and federal politician from Quebec
 Louis Philippe Demers (1863–1951), lawyer and federal politician from Quebec
 Louis-Philippe Demers (1922–1996), honorable pharmacist from the Quebec region
 Modeste Demers (1809–1871), Canadian bishop
 Nicole Demers (born 1950), Canadian politician
 Patrick Demers, Quebec filmmaker
 Paul Demers (1956–2016), Franco-Ontarian singer native of Gatineau
 Philippe Demers (1919–1999), Canadian politician
 Rock Demers (born 1933), Quebec film producer, actor and screenwriter
 Sébastien Demers (born 1979), aka Double Trouble, Canadian boxer
 Stéphane Demers (born 1966), singer and actor from Quebec
 Tony Demers (1917–1997), Quebec ice hockey player

See also 
 Demer, a Belgian river
 Demers Island, an in the Richelieu River in Carignan, Canada